Rachel Horne ( Gibson; born 29 May 1979) is a Northern Irish newsreader and journalist. She presented the BBC children's news programme Newsround from 2002 until 2006. She also presented BBC News' business bulletins on the BBC News Channel and travel news on weekday mornings on BBC Radio 2 in March to December 2018. She joined Virgin Radio UK as a breakfast show newsreader in January 2019. She has been married to comedian Alex Horne since 2005.

Early life
Horne grew up just outside Lisnaskea in County Fermanagh in Northern Ireland, on the shores of Lough Erne. Her father, Terry Gibson, is from Belfast and worked as a magistrate. Her mother, Anne Daly, is from Belleek. Horne’s maternal uncle was Edward Daly (1933–2016), who served as the Roman Catholic Bishop of Derry from 1974 until 1993.

At the age of 18 Horne went travelling and taught English in Vietnam. After reading Law and Theology at Sidney Sussex College, Cambridge, Horne studied for a postgraduate degree in Broadcast Journalism at City, University of London. She married comedian Alex Horne in 2005.

Career
Horne has worked for many BBC outputs including Breakfast with Frost, BBC Radio Five Live and Newsbeat on BBC Radio 1. Horne later worked for BBC Essex on their Breakfast programme as a reporter.

Newsround
Horne joined CBBC's flagship news programme, Newsround in December 2002. Alongside Lizzie Greenwood-Hughes, Thalia Pellegrini and Adam Fleming, Horne was part of the bulletin team and the main reporter. Initially, Horne also presented spin-off programme, Newsround Showbiz until its axe in 2005 due to poor ratings. Horne left Newsround in 2006.

Business News
Following her departure from Newsround, Horne joined BBC Two's flagship business programme Working Lunch. Horne was a member of the team as its business reporter from May 2006. Horne remained on the programme until its relaunch in 2008.

After Working Lunch, Horne joined the BBC News Channel's Business News team in 2009. Horne became a regular presenter, often presenting the afternoon and evening shift. Horne presented Monday to Thursday throughout the afternoon and evening after returning from maternity leave in 2012.

It was announced in 2012 that the BBC News Channel's business bulletins would be axed as part of the Delivering Quality First scheme. Horne left the channel for a time after the move to New Broadcasting house. Horne reappeared presenting the business on the BBC News Channel during 2015 and presented regularly on Tuesdays, Wednesdays and Fridays.

Radio
Horne joined BBC Radio 2 in March 2018, replacing Lynn Bowles as the new regular weekday mornings travel news reporter. When Chris Evans left the BBC for Virgin Radio UK in January 2019, Horne went with him, along with Vassos Alexander and a number of other former Radio 2 breakfast show colleagues. Horne has since on occasion returned to presenting the travel news on Radio 2. Horne took on an expanded role on the new Virgin Radio breakfast show including becoming the programme's newsreader.

Personal life
Horne is married to British comedian Alex Horne, with whom she has three sons. She lives in Chesham, Buckinghamshire.

See also
List of BBC newsreaders and reporters

References

External links
 

Living people
1979 births
People from County Fermanagh
Newsround presenters
BBC Radio 2 presenters
British radio presenters
British television presenters
British women television presenters
British women radio presenters